There are over 20,000 Grade II* listed buildings in England. This page is a list of the five Grade II* listed buildings in the district of Surrey Heath in Surrey. For links to similar articles in relation to the other 10 districts of Surrey see Grade II* listed buildings in Surrey.


|}

Notes

References 
National Heritage List for England

 Surrey Heath
Lists of Grade II* listed buildings in Surrey
Surrey Heath